Kipling Gordon Morison is an electrical engineer with BC Hydro in Burnaby, British Columbia. Morison was named a Fellow of the Institute of Electrical and Electronics Engineers (IEEE) in 2013 for his contributions to on-line stability assessment tools for power systems.

References

Fellow Members of the IEEE
Living people
Year of birth missing (living people)
Place of birth missing (living people)